Kit Taylor (born 1942) is an Australian actor, and the son of actor Grant Taylor. He made his acting debut as Jim Hawkins in the film Long John Silver (1954) and the associated TV series The Adventures of Long John Silver. He went on to have an acting career as an adult.

Filmography

Film

Television

References

External links

Australian male actors
1942 births
Living people